Indra Jātrā, also known as Yenyā (Nepal Bhasa: येँयाः), is the biggest religious street festival in Kathmandu, Nepal. The celebrations consist of two 
events, Indra Jātrā and Kumāri Jātrā. Indra Jātrā is marked by masked dances of deities and demons, displays of sacred images and tableaus in honor of the deity Indra, the king of heaven. Kumāri Jātrā is the chariot procession of the living goddess Kumari.

Family members deceased in the past year are also remembered during the festival. The main venue of the festivities is Kathmandu Durbar Square. The celebrations last for eight days from the 12th day of the bright fortnight to the 4th day of the dark fortnight of Yanlā (ञला), the eleventh month in the lunar Nepal Era calendar.

Indra Jatra was started by King Gunakamadeva- (गुणकामदेव) to commemorate the founding of the Kathmandu city in the 10th century. Kumari Jatra began in the mid-18th century. The celebrations are held according to the lunar calendar, so the dates are changeable.

Opening ceremony

The festival starts with Yosin Thanegu (योसिं थनेगु), the erection of Yosin, a pole from which the banner of Indra is unfurled, at Kathmandu Durbar Square. The pole, a tree shorn of its branches and stripped of its bark, is obtained from a forest near Nālā, a small town 29 km to the east of Kathmandu. It is dragged in stages to Durbar Square by men pulling on ropes.

Another event on the first day is Upāku Wanegu (उपाकु वनेगु) when participants visit shrines holding lighted incense to honor deceased family members. They also place small butter lamps on the way. Some sing hymns as they make the tour. The circuitous route winds along the periphery of the historic part of the city. The procession starts at around 4 pm.

Processions

Kumari Jatra

Kumari Jatra, which means the chariot festival of Kumari, coincides with Indra Jatra. It was started in 1756 AD during the reign of Jaya Prakash Malla.

During this festival, three chariots carrying human representations of the deities Ganesh, Bhairava and Kumari accompanied by musical bands are pulled along the festival route through Kathmandu on three days. The procession starts at around 3 pm.

On the first day of Kumari Jatra known as Kwaneyā (क्वनेया:), the chariots are pulled through the southern part of town. The second day is the full moon day known as Yenya Punhi (येँयाः पुन्हि). During the procession known as Thaneyā (थनेया:), the chariots are drawn through the northern part till Asan. And on the third day Nānichāyā (नानिचाया:), the procession passes through the central section at Kilāgal. Since 2012, the chariot of Kumari has been pulled by an all women's team on the third day of the chariot festival.

 Route on first day of chariot festival, Kwaneyā (downtown procession): Basantapur, Maru, Chikanmugal, Jaisidewal, Lagan, Brahma Marga, Wonde, Hyumata, Kohity, Bhimsensthan, Maru, Basantapur.
 Route on second day of chariot festival, Thaneyā (uptown procession): Basantapur, Pyaphal, Yatkha, Nyata, Tengal, Nhyokha, Nhaikan Tol, Asan, Kel Tol, Indra Chok, Makhan, Basantapur.
 Route on third day of chariot festival, Nānichāyā (midtown procession): Basantapur, Pyaphal, Yatkha, Nyata, Kilagal, Bhedasing, Indra Chok, Makhan, Basantapur.

Mata Biye
Mata Biye (मत बिये) means to offer butter lamps. On the day of Kwaneyā, the first day of the chariot festival, Newars honor family members deceased during the past year by offering small butter lamps along the processional route. They also present butter lamps to relatives and friends on the way as a mark of respect. The procession starts at around 6 pm.

 Route: Maru, Pyaphal, Yatkha, Nyata, Tengal, Nhyokha, Nhaikan Tol, Asan, Kel Tol, Indra Chok, Makhan, Hanuman Dhoka, Maru, Chikanmugal, Jaisidewal, Lagan, Hyumata, Bhimsensthan, Maru.
 Day: On the day of Kwaneyā.

Dagin
The procession of the goddess Dāgin (दागिं) (alternative name: Dāgim) re-enacts Indra mother's going around town in search of her son. The procession consists of a man wearing a mask accompanied by a musical band. It starts at around 8 pm when the chariot of Kumari returns to Maru after journeying around the southern part of town. Dagin is followed by many people who has lost their family member in that specific year.

The procession begins from an alley at the south-western corner of Maru square and passes by the western side of Kasthamandap. The participants follow the festival route north to Asan and then back to Durbar Square. The procession continues to the southern end of town before returning to Maru.

 Route: Maru, Pyaphal, Yatkha, Nyata, Tengal, Nhyokha, Nhaikan Tol, Asan, Kel Tol, Indra Chok, Makhan, Hanuman Dhoka, Maru, Chikanmugal, Jaisidewal, Lagan, Hyumata, Bhimsensthan, Maru.
 Day: On the day of Kwaneyā.

Bau Mata
Bau Mata (बौँ  मत) consists of a long representation of a holy snake made of reeds on which a row of oil lamps are placed. The effigy is suspended from poles carried on the shoulders and taken along the festival route. The procession starts from the southern side of Kasthamandap at Maru. When the Dagin procession returns from the upper part of town and reaches Maru, that is the cue for the Bau Mata procession to set off. It starts at around 9 pm and is organized by the Manandhar caste group.

 Route: Maru, Pyaphal, Yatkha, Nyata, Tengal, Nhyokha, Nhaikan Tol, Asan, Kel Tol, Indra Chok, Makhan, Hanuman Dhoka, Maru, Chikanmugal, Jaisidewal, Lagan, Hyumata, Bhimsensthan, Maru.
 Day: On the day of Kwaneyā.

Exhibitions

Bhairava
Masks of Bhairava are displayed at various places in Kathmandu throughout the eight days of the festival. Bhairava is the terrifying aspect of Shiva. The largest ones are of Sweta Bhairava at Durbar Square, and of Akash Bhairava at Indra Chok. A pipe sticking out of the mouth of Sweta Bhairava dispenses alcohol and rice beer on different days. An image of Bākā Bhairava is exhibited at Wotu, next to Indra Chok.

The mask of Aakash Bhairava is related to the Mahabharata. Some believe it to be the head of the first Kirat King Yalambar. Every night, different groups gather and sing hymns at Indra Chowk.

Indraraj Dyah
Images of Indraraj Dyah with his outstretched hands bound with rope are exhibited on a tall platform at Maru near Durbar Square and at Indra Chok, Kathmandu.

Dasavatar
A tableau is known as Dasavatar or the 10 incarnations of Vishnu is shown on the temple steps in front of Kumari House every night.

Masked dances

Pulu Kisi dance
This is performed by the residents of Kilagal tole. Pulu Kisi is believed to be the carrier of Indra himself. Pulu Kisi goes through the streets of the ancient city Kathmandu in search for his imprisoned master. People view the masked creature with the roar of excitement and laughter. From time to time It does naughty and mischievous things by running through the street knocking anyone that comes in its path and swinging its tail in an amazing manner.Like other dancers, he also has a team of a musical band and a torch carrier in front.

Majipā Lākhey
The demon dance of Majipā Lākhey is performed on the streets and market squares. The Majipa Lakhey dancer and his retinue of musicians move with much agility .He alongside Pulukisi helps in crowd control before chariot procession.

through the streets and crowds spreading the festive mood.

Sawa Bhakku
The Sawa Bhakku dance group from Halchok, at the western edge of the Kathmandu Valley, makes its rounds along the festival route, stopping at major street squares to perform and receive offerings from devotees. The dancers consist of Bhairava (in blue) holding a sword and his two attendants (in red). The ensemble is also known informally as Dhin Nāli Sintān after the sound of their music.

thumb

Devi Pyakhan
Devi Pyakhan from Kilagal, Kathmandu is performed at Kilagal, Hanuman Dhoka, Jaisidewal, Bangemuda, Indrachowk, Kilagal . Dancers wearing masks of various gods & goddesses and the name of them Bhairav, Kumari, Chandi, Daitya, Kawan, Beta, & Khya. As per historical themes The Devi Pyakhan (Devi nach was born the time of Gunakar raj.

Māhākāli Pyakhan
Māhākāli Pyakhan from Bhaktapur performs at Durbar Square and major street squares around Kathmandu. Khyāh Pyākhan (ख्याः प्याखं) features dancers dressed in a costume representing the Khyah, a fat, hairy ape-like creature. Their dance is marked by antics and a lot of tumbling.

In Basantapur
Indra Jatra is celebrated in Basantapur by erecting poles representing Indra at various localities around the city. The poles are known as Yambodyah. Masked dances and Pulu Kisi dance are also performed.

In Terai
Indra Jatra is also observed in some districts of Terai (Nepal and Indian Northern Bihar) as Indra Puja according to the local traditions. Rituals are different than in the Kathmandu Valley but the festival is observed around the same time indicating a common origin of the festival, probably during the Lichhavi period.

Mythology
According to legend, Indra (Hindu god-king of heaven), disguised as a farmer, descended to earth in search of palijā swã (Night jasmine), a white flower his mother Basundhara needed to perform a ritual. As he was plucking the flowers at Maruhiti, a sunken water spout at Maru, the people caught and bound him like a common thief. He was then put on display in the town square of Maru in Kathmandu. (In a reenactment of this event, an image of Indra with his hands bound is put on display at Maru and other places during the festival.)

His mother, worried about his extended absence, came to Kathmandu and wandered around looking for him. (This event is commemorated by the procession of Dagin (दागिं) through the city. Pulu Kisi (alternate name Tānā Kisi), a wicker representation of an elephant, also runs around town reenacting Indra's elephant searching frantically for its master.)

When the city folk realized they had captured Indra himself, they were appalled and immediately released him. Out of appreciation for his release, his mother promised to provide enough dew throughout the winter to ensure a rich crop. It is said that Kathmandu starts to experience foggy mornings from this festival onwards because of this boon.

Closing ceremony
On the last day, the yosin pole erected at Durbar Square is taken down in a ceremony known as Yosin Kwathalegu (योसिं क्वथलेगु). It marks the end of the festivities.

Open air theater
Yenya is also the season of open air theatre productions. Performances depicting social themes, satire and comedy are held on dance platforms or makeshift stages at market squares all over the Kathmandu Valley on the sidelines of the sacred festival. The plays, known as Dabu Pyākhan (दबू प्याखं), have a history going back centuries.

Gallery

See also
Bhairab Naach
Jatra (Nepal)

References

Newar
Hindu festivals in Nepal
Hindu festivals
Nepalese culture
Masked dances
Ritual dances
Sacred dance
Buddhist festivals in Nepal
September observances
October observances
Observances set by the Vikram Samvat calendar
Masquerade ceremonies in Asia